Aedes (Finlaya) harveyi is a species complex of zoophilic mosquito belonging to the genus Aedes. It is found in Sri Lanka, Cambodia, Indonesia, Nepal, India, Thailand, China, Sumatra, Vietnam, and Malaya.

References

External links
Isolation of fourth-instars larva of Aedes (Finlaya) harveyi (Diptera: Culicidae) from the Nilgiri hills, Southern India.
Mosquito Insecticide Resistance Ontology

harveyi